Mordellistena is a genus of beetles in the family Mordellidae, containing the following species:

Mordellistena abaceta Lea, 1917
Mordellistena abessinica Ermisch, 1965
Mordellistena abrupta Ray, 1944
Mordellistena acies Ray, 1949
Mordellistena acuticollis Schilsky, 1895
Mordellistena aegea Franciscolo, 1949
Mordellistena aemula LeConte, 1859
Mordellistena aequalica Ermisch, 1977
Mordellistena aequalis Smith, 1882
Mordellistena aequinoctialis Champion, 1891
Mordellistena aertsi Ermisch, 1963
Mordellistena aethiops Smith, 1882
Mordellistena agalina Ray, 1949
Mordellistena albocapillata Ermisch, 1965
Mordellistena algeriensis Ermisch, 1966
Mordellistena aliena Ermisch, 1967
Mordellistena alpicola Ermisch, 1963
Mordellistena alternizona Lea, 1929
Mordellistena altestriatoides Horak, 1995
Mordellistena altifrons Scegoleva-Barovskaja, 1928
Mordellistena amabilis Maeklin, 1875
Mordellistena amamiensis Nakane, 1956
Mordellistena ambusta LeConte, 1862
Mordellistena amica LeConte, 1862
Mordellistena amphicometa Maeklin, 1875
Mordellistena amplicollis Ermisch, 1941
Mordellistena amurensis Horák, 1982
Mordellistena anaspoides Franciscolo, 1967
Mordellistena andreae LeConte, 1862
Mordellistena andreini Píc, 1933
Mordellistena angolensis Píc, 1937
Mordellistena angulata Ray, 1944
Mordellistena angusta LeConte, 1862
Mordellistena angustatissima Franciscolo, 1967
Mordellistena angusticeps Ray, 1949
Mordellistena angustiformis Ray, 1937
Mordellistena angustula Ermisch, 1977
Mordellistena annuligaster Píc, 1936
Mordellistena annulipyga Champion, 1891
Mordellistena annuliventris Quedenfeldt, 1886
Mordellistena anomala Ermisch, 1968
Mordellistena antennalis (Batten, 1990)
Mordellistena antennaria Franciscolo, 1955
Mordellistena antennata Schilsky, 1906
Mordellistena antiqua Ermisch, 1941
Mordellistena apicata Píc, 1942
Mordellistena apicerufa Ermisch, 1977
Mordellistena apiciventris Píc, 1931
Mordellistena arabica Chobaut, 1904
Mordellistena arabissa Franciscolo, 1957
Mordellistena arcifer Ermisch, 1965
Mordellistena arcuata Ray, 1946
Mordellistena argenteola Liljeblad, 1945
Mordellistena argutula Champion, 1917
Mordellistena arida LeConte, 1862
Mordellistena aritai Nomura, 1964
Mordellistena arizonensis Ray, 1947
Mordellistena aspersa (Melsheimer, 1846)
Mordellistena aterrima (Ermisch, 1952)
Mordellistena atriceps Smith, 1882
Mordellistena atripennis Champion, 1891
Mordellistena atriventris (Pic, 1931)
Mordellistena atroapicalis Píc, 1917
Mordellistena atrocincta Píc, 1925
Mordellistena atrocinctipennis Píc, 1927
Mordellistena atrogemellata Ermisch, 1965
Mordellistena atrolateralis Píc, 1917
Mordellistena atromaculata Píc, 1929
Mordellistena atronitens Lea, 1917
Mordellistena attenuata (Say, 1826)
Mordellistena aureolopilosa Scegoleva-Barovskaja, 1932
Mordellistena aureomicans Ermisch, 1965
Mordellistena aureopubens (Franciscolo, 1967)
Mordellistena aureosplendens (Franciscolo, 1962)
Mordellistena aureotaomentosa Ermisch, 1966
Mordellistena auricapilla (Ermisch, 1952)
Mordellistena auromaculata Kôno, 1928
Mordellistena australasiae Csiki, 1915
Mordellistena austriaca Schilsky, 1898
Mordellistena austriacensis Ermisch, 1956
Mordellistena austrina Champion, 1895
Mordellistena azteca Champion, 1891
Mordellistena badia Liljeblad, 1945
Mordellistena baeri Píc, 1929
Mordellistena balcanica Ermisch, 1967
Mordellistena balearica Compte, 1985
Mordellistena baliani Franciscolo, 1942
Mordellistena bambyrea Franciscolo, 1955
Mordellistena bangueyensis Píc, 1941
Mordellistena barberi Ray, 1937
Mordellistena basalis Maeklin, 1875
Mordellistena basilewskyi Ermisch, 1955
Mordellistena basilunulata Píc, 1936
Mordellistena basimacula Champion, 1891
Mordellistena basithorax Píc, 1929
Mordellistena batteni Horák, 1980
Mordellistena bavarica Ermisch, 1963
Mordellistena beata Champion, 1891
Mordellistena bella Kirsch, 1866
Mordellistena benitensis Píc, 1929
Mordellistena berbera Horák, 1983
Mordellistena bevisi Franciscolo, 1956
Mordellistena beyrodti Lengerken, 1922
Mordellistena bicarinata Champion, 1891
Mordellistena bicentella LeConte, 1862
Mordellistena bicinctella LeConte, 1862
Mordellistena bicolor Horák, 1982
Mordellistena bicoloripes Píc, 1937
Mordellistena bicoloripilosa Ermisch, 1967
Mordellistena bicoloripyga Píc, 1937
Mordellistena bifasciata Ray, 1936
Mordellistena bifurcata Maeklin, 1875
Mordellistena bihamata (Melsheimer, 1846)
Mordellistena bihirsuta Ray, 1947
Mordellistena bimaculicollis Lea, 1931
Mordellistena binhana Píc, 1926
Mordellistena bipartita Píc, 1942
Mordellistena biplagiata Helmuth, 1864
Mordellistena bipunctivertex (Batten, 1990)
Mordellistena bipustulata Helmuth, 1864
Mordellistena biroi Ermisch, 1977
Mordellistena bisbimaculata Píc, 1929
Mordellistena bistrigata Ermisch, 1965
Mordellistena bistrigosa Píc, 1941
Mordellistena bivittata Maeklin, 1875
Mordellistena blandula Liljeblad, 1945
Mordellistena blatchleyi Liljeblad, 1945
Mordellistena bodemeyeri Ermisch, 1956
Mordellistena bogorensis Píc, 1923
Mordellistena boldi Ermisch, 1965
Mordellistena bolognai Horak, 1990
Mordellistena borogolensis Ermisch, 1964
Mordellistena boseni Ray, 1939
Mordellistena brachyacantha (Franciscolo, 1994)
Mordellistena breddini Ermisch, 1963
Mordellistena brevicauda (Boheman, 1849)
Mordellistena brevicornis Schilsky, 1895
Mordellistena brevis Kirsch, 1873
Mordellistena bruneipennis McLeay, 1872
Mordellistena brunneipilis Champion, 1891
Mordellistena brunneispinosa Ermisch, 1963
Mordellistena brunneotincta Mars, 1876
Mordellistena bryani Ray, 1949
Mordellistena bulgarica Ermisch, 1977
Mordellistena buxtoni Blair, 1928
Mordellistena cairnsensis Lea, 1929
Mordellistena caledonica Fauv, 1905
Mordellistena caliginosa Liljeblad, 1945
Mordellistena callens Champion, 1891
Mordellistena callichroa Tokeji, 1953
Mordellistena canariensis Ermisch, 1965
Mordellistena candelabra Ray, 1939
Mordellistena caprai Franciscolo, 1942
Mordellistena carinata Ray, 1930
Mordellistena carinatipennis Ray, 1944
Mordellistena carinthiaca Ermisch, 1966
Mordellistena castanea (Ermisch, 1954)
Mordellistena castaneicolor Champion, 1891
Mordellistena casteneicolor (Ermisch, 1954)
Mordellistena castigata Lea, 1917
Mordellistena cattleyana Champion, 1913
Mordellistena caudatissima Franciscolo, 1967
Mordellistena celebensis Píc, 1925
Mordellistena cervicalis LeConte, 1862
Mordellistena championi Ray, 1930
Mordellistena chapini Ray, 1937
Mordellistena charagolensis Ermisch, 1964
Mordellistena chiapensis Ray, 1939
Mordellistena chopardi Píc, 1950
Mordellistena chrysotrichia Nomura, 1951
Mordellistena cincta Champion, 1891
Mordellistena cinereofasciata Smith, 1882
Mordellistena cinereonotata Champion, 1891
Mordellistena cinnamomea Fahraeus, 1870
Mordellistena claggi Ray, 1936
Mordellistena coelioxys Lea, 1917
Mordellistena cognata Maeklin, 1875
Mordellistena coleae Champion, 1917
Mordellistena columbretensis Compte, 1970
Mordellistena comata (LeConte, 1858)
Mordellistena comes Mars, 1876
Mordellistena concinna Lea, 1917
Mordellistena concolor Lea, 1902
Mordellistena confinis Costa, 1854
Mordellistena conformis Smith, 1883
Mordellistena confusa Blatchley, 1910
Mordellistena conguana Ermisch, 1952
Mordellistena connata Ermisch, 1970
Mordellistena consililis Blair, 1922
Mordellistena consobrina Ermisch, 1977
Mordellistena convicta LeConte, 1862
Mordellistena coomani Píc, 1923
Mordellistena corporaali Píc, 1925
Mordellistena corvina Ermisch, 1950
Mordellistena crassipalpis Champion, 1891
Mordellistena crassipyga Champion, 1891
Mordellistena crinita Liljeblad, 1945
Mordellistena crunneocephala Píc, 1917
Mordellistena crux Champion, 1891
Mordellistena cryptomela Lea, 1931
Mordellistena csiki Ermisch, 1977
Mordellistena cuneigera Champion, 1922
Mordellistena cupreipennis Franciscolo, 1967
Mordellistena curteapicalis Píc, 1926
Mordellistena curtelineata Píc, 1927
Mordellistena curticornis Ermisch, 1977
Mordellistena curvicauda Kirsch, 1873
Mordellistena curvimana Champion, 1891
Mordellistena cuspidata McLeay, 1872
Mordellistena cymbalistria Peyerimhoff, 1925
Mordellistena cypria Ermisch, 1963
Mordellistena dafurensis Ray, 1944
Mordellistena dahomeyana Franciscolo, 1955
Mordellistena dahomeyensis Píc, 1952
Mordellistena dalmatica Ermisch, 1956
Mordellistena dampfi Ray, 1939
Mordellistena danforthi Ray, 1937
Mordellistena darlani Píc, 1941
Mordellistena daturae Blair, 1922
Mordellistena daurica Motsch, 1860
Mordellistena debilis Champion, 1891
Mordellistena decora Ray, 1939
Mordellistena decorella LeConte, 1862
Mordellistena degressa Champion, 1917
Mordellistena dehiscentis Ray, 1949
Mordellistena delicatula Dury, 1906
Mordellistena dentata Batten, 1978
Mordellistena depensis Píc, 1923
Mordellistena despecta Ermisch, 1967
Mordellistena diagonalis Kirsch, 1873
Mordellistena dieckmanni Ermisch, 1963
Mordellistena diegosa Píc, 1917
Mordellistena dietrichi Ray, 1946
Mordellistena difficilis Ermisch, 1963
Mordellistena diffinis Maeklin, 1875
Mordellistena diluta Champion, 1891
Mordellistena dimidiata Helmuth, 1864
Mordellistena discicollis Champion, 1891
Mordellistena discolor (Melsheimer, 1846)
Mordellistena disempta Champion, 1917
Mordellistena dispersa Champion, 1891
Mordellistena distorta Champion, 1891
Mordellistena divergens Ermisch, 1952
Mordellistena diversa Ermisch, 1968
Mordellistena diversestrigosa Píc, 1941
Mordellistena diversipes Píc, 1942
Mordellistena dives Emery, 1876
Mordellistena divisa LeConte, 1859
Mordellistena dlabolai Ermisch, 1967
Mordellistena doherty Píc, 1917
Mordellistena dolini Odnosum, 2005
Mordellistena dolobrata Kirsch, 1873
Mordellistena downesi Medvedev, 1965
Mordellistena dropkini Ray, 1944
Mordellistena dvoraki Ermisch, 1956
Mordellistena dybasi Ray, 1948
Mordellistena echingolensis Ermisch, 1969
Mordellistena edashigei Chûjô, 1956
Mordellistena egregria Lea, 1931
Mordellistena elbresicola Ermisch, 1970
Mordellistena elegantula Smith, 1882
Mordellistena elicodomma Franciscolo, 1967
Mordellistena elongata Fairmaire & Germain, 1863
Mordellistena eludens Allen, 1999
Mordellistena emarginata Ray, 1939
Mordellistena emeryi Schilsky, 1895
Mordellistena endroedyi (Ermisch, 1967)
Mordellistena engelharti Schilsky, 1910
Mordellistena ephippium Ray, 1937
Mordellistena epibraziana Franciscolo, 1955
Mordellistena epicallens Lea, 1931
Mordellistena epidendrana Ray, 1937
Mordellistena episternalis Mulsant, 1856
Mordellistena episternaloides Ermisch, 1963
Mordellistena erdoesi Ermisch, 1977
Mordellistena ermischi Compte, 1966
Mordellistena errans Fall, 1907
Mordellistena erythreana Píc, 1933
Mordellistena erythroderes Hill, 1922
Mordellistena escisa Scegoleva-Barovskaja, 1928
Mordellistena estcourtensis Franciscolo, 1967
Mordellistena eversi Ermisch, 1965
Mordellistena exclamationis Píc, 1924
Mordellistena exclusa Ermisch, 1977
Mordellistena exigua (Boheman, 1858)
Mordellistena exilis Liljeblad, 1917
Mordellistena fageli Ermisch, 1970
Mordellistena fairmairei Csiki, 1915
Mordellistena fallaciosa Ermisch, 1970
Mordellistena falli Csiki, 1915
Mordellistena falsoparvula Ermisch, 1956
Mordellistena falsoparvuliformis Ermisch, 1963
Mordellistena fasciculata Champion, 1891
Mordellistena fasciolata Ermisch, 1950
Mordellistena feigei Ermisch, 1956
Mordellistena fenderi Ray, 1947
Mordellistena fernandezi Palm, 1976
Mordellistena ferruginea Fabricius, 1801
Mordellistena ferruginipes Ermisch, 1966
Mordellistena ferruginoides Smith, 1882
Mordellistena festiva Champion, 1891
Mordellistena filicornis Champion, 1891
Mordellistena flavella Ermisch, 1963
Mordellistena flaviceps Motsch, 1863
Mordellistena flavicornis Champion, 1891
Mordellistena flavifrons Ermisch, 1950
Mordellistena flavocollaris Ray, 1939
Mordellistena flavofrontalis Franciscolo, 1956
Mordellistena flavospinosa Hubenthal, 1911
Mordellistena flavospinulosa Ermisch, 1977
Mordellistena fletcheri Franciscolo, 1959
Mordellistena floridensis Smith, 1882
Mordellistena florissantensis Wickham, 1912
Mordellistena forticornis Champion, 1891
Mordellistena freyi Ermisch
Mordellistena frosti Liljeblad, 1918
Mordellistena fulvicollis (Melsheimer, 1845)
Mordellistena fulvipennis Scegoleva-Barovskaja, 1932
Mordellistena funerea Champion, 1891
Mordellistena fusca Lea, 1895
Mordellistena fuscata (Melsheimer, 1846)
Mordellistena fuscipalpis Ermisch, 1967
Mordellistena fuscipennis (Melsheimer, 1845)
Mordellistena fuscoatra Helmuth, 1864
Mordellistena fuscocastanea Ermisch, 1952
Mordellistena fuscocastenea (Ermisch, 1952)
Mordellistena fuscodoralis Ray, 1936
Mordellistena fuscogemellata Ermisch, 1963
Mordellistena fuscogemellatoides Ermisch, 1977
Mordellistena fuscorufocephala Ermisch, 1967
Mordellistena fuscula Lea, 1917
Mordellistena galapagoensis Van Dyke, 1953
Mordellistena gallica Ermisch, 1956
Mordellistena gardneri Blair, 1930
Mordellistena gemellata Schilsky, 1899
Mordellistena geronensis Ermisch, 1977
Mordellistena gfelleri Horak, 1990
Mordellistena ghanii Franciscolo, 1974
Mordellistena gianassoi Horak, 1991
Mordellistena gibbosa Franciscolo, 1967
Mordellistena gibbula Maeklin, 1875
Mordellistena gigantea Khalaf, 1971
Mordellistena gigas Liljeblad, 1917
Mordellistena gilvifrons Ermisch, 1967
Mordellistena gina (Nomura, 1967)
Mordellistena glipodoides Blair, 1931
Mordellistena goeckei Ermisch, 1941
Mordellistena goetzi Ermisch, 1969
Mordellistena gounellei Píc, 1941
Mordellistena gracilenta (Ermisch, 1952)
Mordellistena gracilicornis Champion, 1891
Mordellistena graciliformis Ray, 1939
Mordellistena gracilipes Píc, 1931
Mordellistena gracilis Schilsky, 1908
Mordellistena grammica LeConte, 1862
Mordellistena grandii Franciscolo, 1942
Mordellistena greenwoodi Blair, 1922
Mordellistena grisea Mulsant, 1856
Mordellistena griseolineata Píc, 1937
Mordellistena guatemalensis Ray, 1944
Mordellistena guttifera Champion, 1891
Mordellistena guttulata Helmuth, 1864
Mordellistena hattorii Tokeji, 1953
Mordellistena hebraica LeConte, 1862
Mordellistena helvetica Ermisch, 1967
Mordellistena heterocolor Ray, 1946
Mordellistena hexastigma Champion, 1891
Mordellistena hidakai (Nomura, 1963)
Mordellistena hirayamai Kônô, 1933
Mordellistena hirticula Smith, 1883
Mordellistena hirtipes Schilsky, 1895
Mordellistena hoana Píc, 1931
Mordellistena hoberlandti Horák, 1983
Mordellistena hollandica Ermisch, 1966
Mordellistena hondurensis Ray, 1939
Mordellistena hoosieri Blatchley, 1910
Mordellistena horioni Ermisch, 1956
Mordellistena horni Píc, 1927
Mordellistena horvathi Ermisch, 1977
Mordellistena huachucaensis Ray, 1946
Mordellistena humeralis (Linnaeus, 1758)
Mordellistena humerifera (Ermisch, 1965)
Mordellistena humeronotata Champion, 1922
Mordellistena humeropicta Ermisch, 1963
Mordellistena humerosignata Píc, 1941
Mordellistena hungarica Ermisch, 1977
Mordellistena husseyi Liljeblad, 1945
Mordellistena hypopygialis Ermisch, 1968
Mordellistena idahoensis Ray, 1946
Mordellistena imbecilla Maeklin, 1875
Mordellistena imitatrix Allen, 1995
Mordellistena immaculaticeps Píc, 1917
Mordellistena impatiens LeConte, 1862
Mordellistena imponderosa Lea, 1931
Mordellistena inaequalis Mulsant, 1856
Mordellistena incana Champion, 1891
Mordellistena incerta Ermisch, 1965
Mordellistena incommunis Liljeblad, 1921
Mordellistena inconstans Fahraeus, 1870
Mordellistena indifferens Píc, 1929
Mordellistena indistincta Smith, 1882
Mordellistena inexpectata Ermisch, 1967
Mordellistena infima LeConte, 1862
Mordellistena infrarufa Píc, 1923
Mordellistena inornata Smith, 1882
Mordellistena inscripta Lea, 1931
Mordellistena insignata Ermisch, 1965
Mordellistena insolita Liljeblad, 1917
Mordellistena instabilis Champion, 1891
Mordellistena insularis (Boheman, 1858)
Mordellistena insulcata Píc, 1929
Mordellistena intermixta Helmuth, 1865
Mordellistena intersecta Emery, 1876
Mordellistena irfianorum Lu & Ivie, 1999
Mordellistena iridescens Kolbe, 1897
Mordellistena iridipennis Lea, 1931
Mordellistena iridomela Lea, 1931
Mordellistena irritans Franciscolo, 1991
Mordellistena isabellina Champion, 1891
Mordellistena isthmica Champion, 1891
Mordellistena istrica Ermisch, 1977
Mordellistena ivoirensis Píc, 1942
Mordellistena jelineki Horák, 1980
Mordellistena jucunda Broun, 1880
Mordellistena kaguyahime Nomura & Kato, 1957
Mordellistena kaszabi Ermisch, 1965
Mordellistena kellersi Blair, 1928
Mordellistena kirghizica Odnosum, 2003
Mordellistena klapperichi Ermisch, 1956
Mordellistena knausi Liljeblad, 1945
Mordellistena kochi Ermisch, 1956
Mordellistena koelleri Ermisch, 1956
Mordellistena koikei Tokeji, 1953
Mordellistena korschefskyana Ermisch, 1963
Mordellistena korschefskyi Ermisch, 1941
Mordellistena kraatzi Emery, 1876
Mordellistena krauseri Plaza Infante, 1986
Mordellistena krujanensis Ermisch, 1963
Mordellistena kubani Horak, 1982
Mordellistena labialis Motsch, 1860
Mordellistena lacensis Píc, 1923
Mordellistena lampros (Franciscolo, 1962)
Mordellistena laterimarginalis Ermisch, 1965
Mordellistena laticollis Champion, 1891
Mordellistena laticornis Ray, 1939
Mordellistena latipalpalis Ray, 1939
Mordellistena latipalposa Ermisch, 1955
Mordellistena latitarsis Batten, 1983
Mordellistena lawrenci Franciscolo, 1967
Mordellistena leai Ray, 1937
Mordellistena lebedevi Roubal, 1929
Mordellistena lebisi Píc, 1937
Mordellistena lecontei Ermisch, 1954
Mordellistena lefiniensis Ermisch, 1967
Mordellistena lemoulti Píc, 1929
Mordellistena lenensis Ermisch, 1977
Mordellistena leonardi Ray, 1946
Mordellistena leontovitchi (Ermisch, 1952)
Mordellistena lepidula LeConte, 1862
Mordellistena leporina LeConte, 1862
Mordellistena lesbia Ermisch, 1965
Mordellistena leveyi Batten, 1989
Mordellistena lichtneckerti Ermisch, 1977
Mordellistena liljebladi Ermisch, 1965
Mordellistena limbalis (Melsheimer, 1846)
Mordellistena lindbergi Ermisch, 1963
Mordellistena lineata Ray, 1937
Mordellistena lineatocollis Champion, 1891
Mordellistena liturata (Melsheimer, 1845)
Mordellistena loasea Germain, 1855
Mordellistena lodingi Liljeblad, 1945
Mordellistena lonai Franciscolo, 1949
Mordellistena longelytrata Franciscolo, 1967
Mordellistena longepygidialis Ermisch, 1968
Mordellistena longevittata Píc, 1925
Mordellistena longicauda Ray, 1930
Mordellistena longicornis Mulsant, 1856
Mordellistena longicornoides Ermisch, 1965
Mordellistena longictena Khalaf, 1971
Mordellistena longipalpis Emery, 1891
Mordellistena longipennis Ermisch, 1952
Mordellistena longipes Lea, 1895
Mordellistena longissima Píc, 1929
Mordellistena longula Kôno, 1928
Mordellistena louisianae Khalaf, 1971
Mordellistena lucida (Batten, 1990)
Mordellistena lucidovirga Ray, 1937
Mordellistena lusitanica Ermisch, 1963
Mordellistena lutea (Melsheimer, 1845?6)
Mordellistena luteespina Ermisch, 1955
Mordellistena luteicornis Ermisch, 1952
Mordellistena luteifrons Champion, 1891
Mordellistena luteipalpis Schilsky, 1895
Mordellistena luteispina Ermisch, 1977
Mordellistena luteoapicipennis Ermisch, 1952
Mordellistena luteofasciata Ermisch, 1962
Mordellistena luteola Champion, 1891
Mordellistena luteolineata Píc, 1929
Mordellistena luteonotata Píc, 1929
Mordellistena luteoquadrinotata Píc, 1937
Mordellistena luteora Kôno, 1932
Mordellistena luteorubra (Ermisch, 1968)
Mordellistena luteovittata Ermisch, 1962
Mordellistena lutericolor (Ermisch, 1955)
Mordellistena luzonica Píc, 1926
Mordellistena macilenta Ray, 1949
Mordellistena macrophthalma (Ermisch, 1952)
Mordellistena maculaticeps Píc, 1931
Mordellistena madecassa Píc, 1917
Mordellistena maedai Nakane, 1956
Mordellistena magyarica Ermisch, 1977
Mordellistena mahena Kolbe, 1910
Mordellistena majorina Lea, 1931
Mordellistena majuscula Ermisch, 1977
Mordellistena malaccana Píc, 1917
Mordellistena malkini Ray, 1947
Mordellistena manteroi Franciscolo, 1942
Mordellistena marginalis (Say, 1824)
Mordellistena marginicollis Maeklin, 1875
Mordellistena marginiloba Franciscolo, 1967
Mordellistena maroccana Ermisch, 1966
Mordellistena martapurana Píc, 1925
Mordellistena masoni Liljeblad, 1918
Mordellistena mauritiensis Píc, 1935
Mordellistena maxillaris Ray, 1944
Mordellistena maxima Píc, 1941
Mordellistena maynei Píc, 1929
Mordellistena mazedonica Ermisch, 1965
Mordellistena mediana Ermisch, 1977
Mordellistena mediogemellata Ermisch, 1977
Mordellistena megacera Lea, 1929
Mordellistena mellissiana Wollaston, 1870
Mordellistena melvillensis Lea, 1917
Mordellistena menoko Kôno, 1932
Mordellistena mentiens Tokeji, 1953
Mordellistena mertoni Heyden, 1911
Mordellistena metcalfi Ray, 1936
Mordellistena meuseli Ermisch, 1956
Mordellistena mexicana Csiki, 1915
Mordellistena micans (Germar, 1817)
Mordellistena micantoides Ermisch, 1954
Mordellistena michalki Ermisch, 1956
Mordellistena microgemellata Ermisch, 1965
Mordellistena microscopica Ermisch, 1977
Mordellistena mihoki Ermisch, 1977
Mordellistena mikado Tokeji, 1953
Mordellistena militaris LeConte, 1862
Mordellistena minima Costa, 1854
Mordellistena minor Píc, 1937
Mordellistena minuscula Píc, 1941
Mordellistena minuta Smith, 1882
Mordellistena minutalis Liljeblad, 1945
Mordellistena minutella (Ermisch, 1968)
Mordellistena minutissimus Champion, 1891
Mordellistena minutula Ermisch, 1956
Mordellistena minutuloides Ermisch, 1966
Mordellistena misella Maeklin, 1875
Mordellistena mississippiensis Khalaf, 1971
Mordellistena mixta Ray, 1946
Mordellistena miyamotoi Nakane, 1956
Mordellistena mogadiscioana Píc, 1953
Mordellistena monardi Píc, 1937
Mordellistena mongolica Ermisch, 1964
Mordellistena montana Kolbe, 1898
Mordellistena montrouzieri Csiki, 1915
Mordellistena moresbyensis (Batten, 1990)
Mordellistena morula LeConte, 1862
Mordellistena mostarensis Ermisch, 1977
Mordellistena motoensis Píc, 1931
Mordellistena mrazi Píc, 1924
Mordellistena muchei Ermisch, 1965
Mordellistena mullahyi Khalaf, 1971
Mordellistena mulsanti Ermisch, 1956
Mordellistena multicarinata Ray, 1944
Mordellistena multicicatrix Kangas, 1986
Mordellistena multicolor Franciscolo, 1967
Mordellistena multicolorata Batten, 1990
Mordellistena multilineata Lea, 1917
Mordellistena multistrigosa Ermisch, 1967
Mordellistena murina Champion, 1891
Mordellistena mutabilis Champion, 1891
Mordellistena nana Motschulsky, 1860
Mordellistena nanula Ermisch, 1967
Mordellistena nanuloides Ermisch, 1967
Mordellistena nearctica Wickham, 1915
Mordellistena nebusola Liljeblad, 1945
Mordellistena neglecta Broun, 1880
Mordellistena neocincta Ray, 1946
Mordellistena neofascia Ray, 1946
Mordellistena nepalensis Horak, 1995
Mordellistena nessebaricus Batten, 1980
Mordellistena neuwaldeggiana (Panzer, 1796)
Mordellistena nigella Liljeblad, 1945
Mordellistena nigrescens Blair, 1928
Mordellistena nigricans Melsheimer, 1846
Mordellistena nigriceps Champion, 1891
Mordellistena nigrifrons Ermisch, 1950
Mordellistena nigrimaculata Franciscolo, 1967
Mordellistena nigripennis Fabricius, 1798
Mordellistena nigripilis Champion, 1891
Mordellistena nigrispinosa (Ermisch, 1953)
Mordellistena nigritarsis Horák, 1996
Mordellistena nigritula (Ermisch, 1968)
Mordellistena nigriventris Píc, 1937
Mordellistena nigroapicalis Píc, 1923
Mordellistena nigrobimaculata Chobaut, 1924
Mordellistena nigrobrunnen 
Mordellistena nigrocapillata Ermisch, 1965
Mordellistena nigrofasciata Chûjô, 1935
Mordellistena nigrogemellata Ermisch, 1964
Mordellistena nigropectoralis Ermisch, 1952
Mordellistena nigropygidialis Píc, 1950
Mordellistena nigrosignata Maeklin, 1875
Mordellistena nitidicoma Lea, 1929
Mordellistena noctivaga Franciscolo, 1962
Mordellistena nomurai Tokeji, 1953
Mordellistena notabilis Maeklin, 1875
Mordellistena nubila (LeConte, 1858)
Mordellistena nunenmacheri Liljeblad, 1918
Mordellistena nyctaletes Franciscolo, 1962
Mordellistena obliquestrigosa Franciscolo, 1967
Mordellistena obscurinotata Ray, 1944
Mordellistena obscuriventris Píc, 1927
Mordellistena obscurosuturalis Ermisch, 1964
Mordellistena occidentalis Champion, 1891
Mordellistena oceanica Ray, 1944
Mordellistena ocularis Franciscolo, 1967
Mordellistena oculata Champion, 1891
Mordellistena okamotoi Kôno, 1935
Mordellistena okinawana Nomura, 1963
Mordellistena olympica Ermisch, 1965
Mordellistena opalescenticeps Champion, 1891
Mordellistena oraniensis Píc, 1900
Mordellistena orizabensis Maeklin, 1875
Mordellistena ornata (Melsheimer, 1845)
Mordellistena ornatipennis Ray, 1939
Mordellistena otohime Nomura & Kato, 1957
Mordellistena ozarkensis Ray, 1936
Mordellistena ozeana (Nakane, 1957)
Mordellistena paiwana (Nomura, 1967)
Mordellistena palawana Píc, 1927
Mordellistena palembanga Píc, 1941
Mordellistena pallens Fall, 1907
Mordellistena palliata Kôno, 1932
Mordellistena pallida Champion, 1896
Mordellistena pallidoptera Khalaf, 1971
Mordellistena pallipes Smith, 1882
Mordellistena palmi Liljeblad, 1945
Mordellistena palpalis Champion, 1891
Mordellistena parabrevicauda Ermisch, 1965
Mordellistena paradisa Liljeblad, 1945
Mordellistena paradohumeralis Ermisch, 1963
Mordellistena paraepisternalis Ermisch, 1965
Mordellistena paraintersecta Ermisch, 1965
Mordellistena parallela Ray, 1930
Mordellistena paramoresbyensis (Batten, 1990)
Mordellistena paranana Ermisch, 1977
Mordellistena paraobscurosuturalis Ermisch, 1965
Mordellistena parapentas Ermisch, 1977
Mordellistena pararhenana Ermisch, 1977
Mordellistena parasimilaris Ermisch, 1955
Mordellistena paraweisei Ermisch, 1977
Mordellistena parcestrigosa (Franciscolo, 1994)
Mordellistena partilis Champion, 1917
Mordellistena parumstrigosa Franciscolo, 1967
Mordellistena parva Liljeblad, 1945
Mordellistena parvicauda Ermisch, 1969
Mordellistena parvula (Gyllenhal, 1827)
Mordellistena parvuliformis Stshegoleva-Barovskaya, 1930
Mordellistena parvuloides Ermisch, 1956
Mordellistena paucistrigosa Ermisch, 1965
Mordellistena pauxilla Liljeblad, 1945
Mordellistena pectoralis LeConte, 1850
Mordellistena peloponnesensis Batten, 1980
Mordellistena pendeleburyi Píc, 1936
Mordellistena pentas Mulsant, 1856
Mordellistena perantennata Franciscolo, 1967
Mordellistena perexigua Champion, 1891
Mordellistena permira Franciscolo, 1949
Mordellistena perparvula Ermisch, 1966
Mordellistena perroudi Mulsant, 1856
Mordellistena persica Horák, 1983
Mordellistena petaini Píc, 1941
Mordellistena pfefferi Ermisch, 1963
Mordellistena piceopyga Píc, 1941
Mordellistena picilabris Helmuth, 1864
Mordellistena picipennis Smith, 1882
Mordellistena piciventris Ermisch, 1952
Mordellistena pictipennis Champion, 1891
Mordellistena pilipennis Ray, 1944
Mordellistena pilosa Champion, 1891
Mordellistena pilosella Ray, 1947
Mordellistena pilosovittata Nakane, 1956
Mordellistena pilosula Maeklin, 1875
Mordellistena ploiaria Ray, 1949
Mordellistena pluristrigosa (Ermisch, 1967)
Mordellistena podlussanyi Csetó, 1990
Mordellistena poecila Ray, 1949
Mordellistena pontica Ermisch, 1977
Mordellistena postcoxalis Lea, 1931
Mordellistena postdiscoidalis Píc, 1937
Mordellistena potamophila Franciscolo, 1962
Mordellistena praesagita Kangas, 1988
Mordellistena praetoriana Franciscolo, 1967
Mordellistena pratensis Smith, 1883
Mordellistena prescutellaris Píc, 1929
Mordellistena propinqua (Ermisch, 1967)
Mordellistena protogaoa Wickham, 1915
Mordellistena psammophila de Peyerimhoff
Mordellistena pseudobrevicauda Ermisch, 1963
Mordellistena pseudohirtipes Ermisch, 1965
Mordellistena pseudohumeralis Nakane, 1956
Mordellistena pseudolatipalposa Franciscolo, 1967
Mordellistena pseudomicans Ermisch, 1977
Mordellistena pseudonana Ermisch, 1956
Mordellistena pseudoparvula Ermisch, 1956
Mordellistena pseudopumila Ermisch, 1963
Mordellistena pseudoreichei Ermisch, 1977
Mordellistena pseudorhenana Ermisch, 1977
Mordellistena pseudorugipennis Ermisch, 1963
Mordellistena pseudotarsata Ermisch, 1964
Mordellistena puberula Maeklin, 1875
Mordellistena pubescens (Fabricius, 1798)
Mordellistena pulcherima Lea, 1917
Mordellistena pulchra Liljeblad, 1917
Mordellistena pulicaria Champion, 1891
Mordellistena pullata Liljeblad, 1945
Mordellistena pumiblosoidea Franciscolo, 1955
Mordellistena pumila (Gyllenhal, 1810)
Mordellistena purpurascens Costa, 1854
Mordellistena purpureonigrans Ermisch, 1963
Mordellistena purpureotincta Lea, 1929
Mordellistena pustulata (Melsheimer, 1846)
Mordellistena pygidialis Píc, 1949
Mordellistena pygmaea Ermisch, 1952
Mordellistena pygmaeola Ermisch, 1956
Mordellistena pyrenaea Ermisch, 1966
Mordellistena quadrifasciata Champion, 1891
Mordellistena quadrinotata Liljeblad, 1921
Mordellistena quadrinotatipennis Píc, 1928
Mordellistena quadrisulcata Píc, 1939
Mordellistena quinquemaculata Píc, 1927
Mordellistena quinquenotata Champion, 1927
Mordellistena rayi Ermisch, 1965
Mordellistena reichei Emery, 1876
Mordellistena reitteri Schilsky, 1894
Mordellistena rhenana Ermisch, 1956
Mordellistena rhenolepis Ray, 1939
Mordellistena rhizophorae Lea, 1925
Mordellistena robusticollis Píc, 1937
Mordellistena rodericensis Blair
Mordellistena ruandana (Ermisch, 1955)
Mordellistena ruandensis Ermisch, 1955
Mordellistena rubida Ermisch, 1847
Mordellistena rubrahumeralis Ermisch, 1955
Mordellistena rubricollis Champion, 1891
Mordellistena rubrifascia Liljeblad, 1945
Mordellistena rubrifrons Ermisch, 1955
Mordellistena rubrofrontalis Ray, 1936
Mordellistena rufa Liljeblad, 1917
Mordellistena rufescens Smith, 1882
Mordellistena ruficeps (Boheman, 1858)
Mordellistena rufifrons Schilsky, 1894
Mordellistena rufilabris Liljeblad, 1945
Mordellistena rufiventris Helmuth, 1864
Mordellistena rufobrunnea Champion, 1927
Mordellistena rufocephala Ray, 1936
Mordellistena rufohumeralis Píc, 1937
Mordellistena rufomaculata Píc, 1917
Mordellistena rufonotata Champion, 1891
Mordellistena rufopyga Champion, 1891
Mordellistena rufospinosa Ermisch, 1977
Mordellistena rufotestacea Motsch, 1863
Mordellistena rufula Helmuth
Mordellistena rugipennis Schilsky, 1895
Mordellistena rusticula Maeklin, 1875
Mordellistena rutila Liljeblad, 1917
Mordellistena saganensis Píc, 1952
Mordellistena sajoi Ermisch, 1977
Mordellistena salisburiana Franciscolo, 1967
Mordellistena sanguinicollis Champion, 1891
Mordellistena santiagona Píc, 1929
Mordellistena saxonica Ermisch, 1967
Mordellistena scalaris Helmuth, 1864
Mordellistena scapularis (Say, 1824)
Mordellistena schatzmayri Franciscolo, 1949
Mordellistena schauppi Smith, 1882
Mordellistena schoutedeni Píc, 1931
Mordellistena schwarzi Ray, 1939
Mordellistena scudderiana Wickham, 1915
Mordellistena secreta Horák, 1983
Mordellistena sejugata Ermisch, 1965
Mordellistena semiferruginea Reitter, 1911
Mordellistena semilikiana Franciscolo, 1959
Mordellistena semilutea Ray, 1930
Mordellistena semipygmaeola Ermisch, 1964
Mordellistena semirufa Maeklin, 1875
Mordellistena semiusta LeConte, 1862
Mordellistena senilis Ermisch, 1952
Mordellistena separanda Ermisch, 1965
Mordellistena sepia Ray, 1939
Mordellistena septemcarinata Champion, 1917
Mordellistena sericans Fall, 1907
Mordellistena sericata Wollaston, 1864
Mordellistena serraticornis Horak, 1991
Mordellistena serratipes Lea, 1931
Mordellistena sexmaculata Champion, 1891
Mordellistena sexnotata Dury, 1902
Mordellistena sibirica Ermisch, 1977
Mordellistena signaticollis Quedenfeldt, 1885
Mordellistena signicollis Schilsky, 1894
Mordellistena similaris Ermisch, 1952
Mordellistena similata Ermisch, 1968
Mordellistena similis Shchegolvera-Barovskaya
Mordellistena simillima Franciscolo, 1956
Mordellistena simplex Maeklin, 1875
Mordellistena simplicicolor Píc, 1927
Mordellistena singularis Smith, 1882
Mordellistena sinuata Fairmaire, 1897
Mordellistena smithi Dury, 1902
Mordellistena smithiana Wickham, 1913
Mordellistena solarii Franciscolo, 1942
Mordellistena sonorensis Ray, 1939
Mordellistena soror Ermisch, 1941
Mordellistena sparsa Champion, 1891
Mordellistena splendens Smith, 1882
Mordellistena squamipilosa Ermisch, 1967
Mordellistena stellata Ermisch, 1968
Mordellistena stenidea Mulsant, 1856
Mordellistena stephani Downie, 1987
Mordellistena steppensis Ermisch, 1965
Mordellistena stoeckleini Ermisch, 1956
Mordellistena subaenea Champion, 1891
Mordellistena subdiscoidalis Chobaut, 1924
Mordellistena subepisternalis Ermisch, 1965
Mordellistena subfasciata Píc, 1927
Mordellistena subfuscus Liljeblad, 1945
Mordellistena subincana Ermisch, 1967
Mordellistena subpellucida Lea, 1929
Mordellistena subsquamosa Schilsky, 1899
Mordellistena subunicolor Píc, 1937
Mordellistena subunifasciata Chobaut, 1924
Mordellistena sudaniensis Ray, 1944
Mordellistena sumifubra Champion, 1927
Mordellistena suspecta Fall, 1907
Mordellistena suturalis Ray, 1947
Mordellistena suturella Helmuth, 1864
Mordellistena swezeyi Blair, 1928
Mordellistena swierstrai Franciscolo, 1967
Mordellistena syntaenia Liljeblad, 1921
Mordellistena syrites Ermisch, 1977
Mordellistena tabascana Champion, 1891
Mordellistena tadjikistanica Horák, 1980
Mordellistena takizawai Kôno, 1932
Mordellistena tantula Liljeblad, 1945
Mordellistena taorminensis Ermisch, 1965
Mordellistena tarsalis Smith, 1883
Mordellistena tarsata Mulsant, 1856
Mordellistena teneriffensis Ermisch, 1965
Mordellistena tenuicornis Schilsky, 1899
Mordellistena tenuimanus Champion, 1927
Mordellistena tenuipalpis Champion, 1891
Mordellistena tenuis Fairmaire, 1892
Mordellistena terminata Ray, 1946
Mordellistena tessellata Champion, 1891
Mordellistena testacea Blatchley, 1910
Mordellistena testaceiceps Píc, 1925
Mordellistena testaceicolor Píc, 1917
Mordellistena testaceimembris Píc, 1926
Mordellistena testaceipalpis Ermisch, 1955
Mordellistena testaceithorax Franciscolo, 1967
Mordellistena testaceomarginata Píc, 1937
Mordellistena testacepennis Ermisch, 1955
Mordellistena tetraspilota Burne, 1989
Mordellistena texana Smith, 1882
Mordellistena thoracalis Franciscolo, 1967
Mordellistena thurepalmi Ermisch, 1965
Mordellistena thuringiaca Ermisch, 1963
Mordellistena tibialis Lea, 1917
Mordellistena tibiella Ermisch, 1965
Mordellistena tokaraensis Nakane, 1956
Mordellistena tondui Horak, 1996
Mordellistena tonkinensis Píc, 1936
Mordellistena torresensis Lea, 1929
Mordellistena tosgoniensis Ermisch, 1969
Mordellistena tosta LeConte, 1862
Mordellistena triangularis Píc, 1929
Mordellistena trichura Lea, 1917
Mordellistena trifasciata (Say, 1826)
Mordellistena trilinea Champion, 1891
Mordellistena trilineata Mulsant, 1856
Mordellistena trimaculata Mulsant, 1863
Mordellistena trinotata Píc, 1929
Mordellistena trisignata Píc, 1931
Mordellistena tristrigosa Píc, 1941
Mordellistena tsutsuii Nakane, 1956
Mordellistena turkmenica Odnosum, 2003
Mordellistena ulanbatorensis Ermisch, 1967
Mordellistena umbmala Ermisch, 1970
Mordellistena umbra Franciscolo, 1949b
Mordellistena umbrosa Champion, 1891
Mordellistena unicolor LeConte, 1862
Mordellistena unifasciolata Ermisch, 1965
Mordellistena uniformis Ray, 1946
Mordellistena unistrigosa Píc, 1941
Mordellistena unisulcata Píc, 1916
Mordellistena uralensis Csiki, 1915
Mordellistena ustulata LeConte, 1862
Mordellistena uvsensis Ermisch, 1970
Mordellistena vadoni Píc, 1937
Mordellistena vafer Champion, 1891
Mordellistena valens Champion, 1891
Mordellistena vanhillei (Ermisch, 1954)
Mordellistena vapida LeConte, 1862
Mordellistena variabilis Píc, 1931
Mordellistena varians LeConte, 1862
Mordellistena variegata (Fabricius, 1798)
Mordellistena varietas Ray, 1937
Mordellistena venezuelensis Ray, 1930
Mordellistena venusta Champion, 1891
Mordellistena vera Liljeblad, 1917
Mordellistena veraepacis Champion, 1891
Mordellistena vestita Ray, 1944
Mordellistena vicina Champion, 1891
Mordellistena vidua Nakane, 1956
Mordellistena vilis (LeConte, 1858)
Mordellistena villiersi Franciscolo, 1955
Mordellistena viridescens Liljeblad, 1945
Mordellistena visai Horák, 1983
Mordellistena vogti Ermisch, 1963
Mordellistena wagneri Píc, 1929
Mordellistena walshi Ray, 1948
Mordellistena wankai Ermisch, 1966
Mordellistena weisei Schilsky, 1895
Mordellistena wenzeli Liljeblad, 1945
Mordellistena wickhami Liljeblad, 1945
Mordellistena wiebesi Batten, 1977
Mordellistena wittei Píc, 1950
Mordellistena wolcotti Liljeblad, 1917
Mordellistena xanthocephala Blair, 1922
Mordellistena xanthonota Franciscolo, 1955
Mordellistena xanthopyga Champion, 1891
Mordellistena yangi Fan, 1995
Mordellistena yezoensis Chûjô, 1957
Mordellistena y-nigrum Ray, 1937
Mordellistena y-notata Ray, 1947
Mordellistena yumae Ray, 1946
Mordellistena zavattarii Píc, 1952
Mordellistena zavchanensis Ermisch, 1970
Mordellistena zimmermani Ray, 1949
Mordellistena zoltani Ermisch, 1977
Mordellistena zosijniensis Ermisch, 1969
Mordellistena zotalebrevior Píc, 1938
Mordellistena zululandiae Franciscolo, 1956
Mordellistena zuuncharaensis Ermisch, 1965

References

External links
 

 
Mordellidae
Taxa named by Oronzio Gabriele Costa
Polyphaga genera